The following properties are listed on the National Register of Historic Places in Pittsburgh, Pennsylvania.

This is intended to be a complete list of the properties and districts on National Register of Historic Places in the city of Pittsburgh, Pennsylvania, United States. The locations of National Register properties and districts for which the latitude and longitude coordinates are included below, may be seen in an online map.

There are 254 properties and districts listed on the National Register in the county, including 10 National Historic Landmarks. Pittsburgh is the location of 182 of these properties and districts, including 5 National Historic Landmarks, which are listed here. The properties and districts elsewhere in the county, including 5 National Historic Landmarks, are listed separately. Four properties are split between Pittsburgh and other parts of the county.

Current listings

|}

See also

 National Register of Historic Places listings in Allegheny County, Pennsylvania
 National Register of Historic Places listings in Pennsylvania
 List of National Historic Landmarks in Pennsylvania
 List of City of Pittsburgh historic designations
 List of Pittsburgh History and Landmarks Foundation Historic Landmarks
 List of Pennsylvania state historical markers in Allegheny County

References

Pittsburgh-related lists
Pittsburgh